Government Degree College Jaranwala is only government college of Jaranwala tehsil of Pakistan.it is oldest and historic educational institution of Jaranwala it was established in 1960 in 47 acre area. it is biggest college by area in Punjab. This college is affiliated with University of Punjab Affiliated with Govt. college university Fsd

See also
Government Islamia High School Jaranwala
Govt. College of Commerce, Abdullah Pur, Faisalabad

References

Public universities and colleges in Punjab, Pakistan
Education in Faisalabad
Universities and colleges in Faisalabad District